Bulusu Sambamurti (4 March 1886 – 2 February 1958) was an Indian lawyer, politician and freedom-fighter, who served as the President of the Madras Legislative Council from 1937 to 1942. He was thus the first speaker of Madras presidency assembly. He was popularly known as Maharshi Bulusu Sambamurti.

Early life
Sambamurti was born on 4 March 1886 in a Telugu Vaidiki Velnadu Brahmin family in the village of Dulla in Godavari district, Madras Presidency. His father Bulusu Subbavadhanulu was a Vedic scholar. Sambamurti had his schooling in his native village and graduated in Physics from Maharajah's College, Vizianagaram. He worked for a short period as a lecturer before pursuing a course in law. Sambamurti graduated as a lawyer in 1911 and immediately enrolled in the bar at Cocanada. When the Non-Cooperation movement broke out in 1920, inspired by a speech by Konda Venkatapayya Pantulu, he gave up his profession and plunged into the Indian freedom struggle. When giving up his lucrative career, he quoted that poverty is better than slavery (దాస్యం కంటే దారిద్యం మేలు).

In the Indian independence movement
Sambamurti adopted Gandhian principles and ways of life. In 1923, he became a member of the organizing committee of the Cocanada session of the Indian National Congress. He became one of the first leaders to demand Purna Swaraj (complete independence).

In April 1930, he participated in a Salt Satyagraha at Chollangi near Kakinada and was arrested on 18 April 1930 and sent to Vellore jail. He stood in the 1937 Madras assembly elections and was successful. The Indian National Congress won the elections and Sambamurti was made President of the Madras Legislative Council. He served from 1937 till 1942 when he resigned due to the outbreak of the Quit India Movement.

In the Andhra movement
Bulusu Sambamurti was also connected with the Andhrodyamam (Andhra movement) being a hard and active advocate for a separate Telugu Province comprising Telugu areas in Madras Presidency. When Potti Sriramulu decided to fast unto death at Madras in 1952 on the issue of formation of Andhra province, nobody was prepared to give shelter. Then Sambamurthy placed his residence at his disposal, though all others became beneficiaries later. Potti Sriramulu fasted to death for the state of Andhra. Sambamurthy took to loin cloth discarding shirt in the true Gandhian style.

Having lost his wife and position in public life, he spent his last days in penury at his hometown of Kakinada. Those who adored him earlier, avoided and even ignored him. Hearing about his plight, Govind Ballabh Pant, the then Union minister rendered financial assistance. He died in penury as a neglected patriot. A popular anecdote is that when his daughter applied for financial assistance, powers-that-be in the Secretariat wanted to know who Sambamurthy was.

Death
Sambamurti died at 6.10 AM on February 2 1958 at his own house. His body has been offered last respects by then minister Sri Anagani Bhagavantarao,  A. Krishnaswami, district collector, Victor, district SP, Dantu Bhaskararao, Chairman of Kakinada municipality, Pyda Venkatanarayana, Mullapudi Pallamraju, and R. Tirupathirao, among others. Some others who paid condolences are Neelam Sanjeeva Reddy and Rajaji.

See also
 List of speakers of the Tamil Nadu Legislative Assembly

References

1886 births
1958 deaths
Indian National Congress politicians from Andhra Pradesh
Telugu politicians
People from Kakinada
Members of the Andhra Pradesh Legislative Assembly
Andhra movement